Bálint Drugeth de Geren et Homonna (1577 – 7 November 1609), also anglicized as Valentine Drugeth, was judge royal of the Kingdom of Hungary from 1608 to 1609.

Early life 

Bálint was the son of István Drugeth, ispán (or head) of Ung County, and Fruzsina Török. He was born in 1577.

Career 

He joined Stephen Bocskai in early 1605. Bocskai named Drugeth his successor in his last will.

References

Sources 

 
 

1577 births
1609 deaths
Judges royal
Balint